Savage is the eighth studio album by American R&B singer-songwriter Tank. It was released on September 29, 2017 by Atlantic Records and his synergetic label R&B Money. The album debuted and peaked at number 24 number US Billboard 200 and at number 17 on Billboards Top R&B/Hip-Hop Albums. The album's leading single "When We" became his first US Billboard Hot 100 entry as a solo artist in over a decade and peaked at number one on the Adult R&B Songs chart.

Critical reception

Andy Kellman of AllMusic rated Savage two and a half out of five stars. He wrote that "this isn't quite as jarring as hearing a new jack swing album by an artist who debuted in the early '70s — Babbs is genuinely plugged into the material with a voice at full, commanding power — but the quality of the material is ultimately unexceptional."

Track listing

Charts

Release history

References

2017 albums
Tank (American singer) albums
Atlantic Records albums